Schwarzer Sarg is Yōsei Teikoku's sixth single, released on July 9, 2008. It peaked at #43 on the Oricon single charts. The single includes a bonus DVD with a music video. The name of the title track means "black coffin" in German.

Track listing
CD
 Schwarzer Sarg - 5:41
 Wisdom -  4:57
 Schwarzer Sarg (instrumental) - 5:41
 Wisdom (instrumental) - 4:54

DVD
 Schwarzer Sarg

2008 singles
Lantis (company) singles
2008 songs
Song articles with missing songwriters